The House of Nnofo is the ruling dynasty of the Nnewi Kingdom, a subnational monarchy that is part of the Nigerian chieftaincy system in Nigeria. The authority of the Nnofo dynasty is primarily in Otolo. In the other three quarters of Nnewi, the influence of the Nnofo monarch is felt but very slightly – a situation which has arisen from the fact that the chiefs in these quarters are virtually autonomous. Royal descent plays an important role in many Igbo societies; authority and property tend to be lineally derived. Among the tribes which recognize a single ruler, the hereditary bloodline of the rulers (who early European travelers described as kings, queens, princes, etc., using the terminology of European monarchy) forms a dynasty.

Line of succession to the Nnewi throne 

The Nnofo royal lineage consists of the reigning monarch of the Nnewi Kingdom in Anambra State, Nigeria, Igwe Kenneth Orizu III, his consorts, legitimate descendants, near relatives and male-line descendants of his twelve great-grandfathers King Otolo who is a son of Digbo, one of the sons of Nnewi.  Chief Otolo, the first son of Digbo, who became the sixth chief of Nnewi and naturally, the first chief of Otolo people, reigned from 1631–1639. Chief Otolo had many sons – Enem the first son followed by Nnofo, Eziogwugwu alias Eziegbelu, Diaba whose descendants are generally known Umuzu and Nnangana alias Nganaga. Upon the death of Otolo, the seventh chief of Nnewi was chief Enem. He had three sons – Ogbe, Dogonu and Dunu Sie. Chief Enem amicably handed over rule to Nnofo who thus became the eight chief of Nnewi.

Nnofo (and not Umu Enem who are the descendant of the first son of Otolo) then became the ruling family of Otolo. The position Nnofos, the owners of Ndi-Ichie akwa, occupy in Otolo is definitely not as of right but of accident, just as the engulfment of Uru, for example, with Umu Dim was a matter of chance. Nnofo was to have been succeeded on his death by Eze Nwana had the latter not been earlier expelled by the former, his father, as a result of a serious offence he committed. When Nnofo therefore died, Udude succeeded him as the ninth chief, and had many sons as follows: Eze Agha, Ukadibia, Dala who, like Nluonu, committed an ewe offence, Eze Nnebo, Eze Aghagwo, Eze kali, Eze Dunu. The descendants of these seven sons are known today as Udude Ama Nasaa.

When Udude died, his first son, Eze Agha, became the tenth chief. The eleventh chief after Eze Agha was his first son Eze Agha jnr who, like Okpala, was not an able ruler. He therefore gave up his rule and Eze Nnwa, his brother, became the twelfth chief of Nnewi. One of the wives of Eze Nnwa was uduji the mother of Eze Oguine. She was married from Ezi Abubo in Abubo. Eze Oguine took his father’s place when he died and became the thirteenth chief of Nnewi. He like his father married many wives. Eze Oguine’s sons were, first Eze Chukwu the son of a woman called Onyebuchi, Eze Enwe the son of a woman called Nwakannwa, Ukatu the son of Akuabunwa, Ilechukwu and many others.

After the death of the thirteenth ruler, Eze Chukwu took over as the fourteenth. Eze Chukwu’s sons were Eze Ukwu, Eze Onyiwalu and Eze Asunyuo,
Upon Eze Chukwu’s death his son, Eze Ukwu, became the fifteenth chief.  Besides Okafo, the first son of Eze ukwu, he had also the following sons – Eze Oruchalu and Unaegbu.

When Eze Ukwu died, Okafo, his eldest son, became the sixteenth chief. His issues, besides Eze Ifekaibeya, his first son, were Eze Ononenyi, udeaja, Atuegwu, and many others. When Okafo died, Eze Ifekaibeya took over as the seventeenth chief. The following were the wives of Eze Ifekaibeya — (i) Mgbafo Eze Kwenna (ii) Uduagu (iii) Nwakaku Onwusilikam (iv) Afiazu (v) Nonu (vi) Mmegha and (vii) Ukonnwa.  Among his issues were Eze Ugbonyamba his first son, Eze Nnaweigbo the son of Mmegha, Eze Enefeanya alias Oji, and Ofodile who was of the same mother with Eze Ugbonyamba.
Eze Ifekaibeya was succeeded by Eze Ugbonyamba alias Igwe Orizu I as the eighteenth chief of Nnewi. Eze Ugbonyamba married about an hundred wives among whom were (i)Uzoagbala the mother of Josiah Nnaji Orizu(ii)Ejeagwu (iii) Mgbugo noted for her dazzling beauty and command of respect (iv) Uzumma (v) Nwabudu (vi) Afuekwe (vii) Esomeju (viii) Amini (ix) Anyaku (x) Oyilidiya (ix) olieukwu (xii) Onyeanu (xiii) Odife (xiv) Oliemma (xv) Akuzulumba (xvi) Ogbeanu (xvii) Ojinukanu and (xviii) Alozo.
Eze Ugbonyamba died in 1924 and was succeeded in the same year by his son – Josiah nnaji Orizu alias Igwe Orizu II as the nineteenth chief of Nnewi. Josiah was born in 1903.
Josiah, upon his death, was succeeded by his son, Kenneth Onyeneke alias Igwe Orizu III as the twentieth chief of Nnewi though of seventeenth generation.
It is sometimes not known from which stem Chief Kenneth Igwe Orizu III of Onyebuchi family and Chief Benedict Nwosu Nwakanwa family branched off. It is important to say it here.

Eze Oguine, the thirteenth chief of Nnewi, married Onyebuchi and Nwakanwa among other wives.  The first son of Eze Oguine was the son of Onyebuchi. His name was Eze Chukwu the fourteenth chief of Nnewi.  The son of Nwakanwa was Ekwegbalu alias Eze Enwe. Since the descendant of Eze Chukwu have been traced up to chief Kenneth Orizu the present and the twentieth chief of Nnewi, it is meet to trace here chief Eze Enwe’s line up to Chief Benedict Nwosu alias Dikeana-agbaluizu.

Preservation of the royal lineage 

As paramount chief within the Nnewi kingdom and pursuant to the preservation of Nnewi traditional leadership, the hereditary head of the Nnewi kingdom was challenged on December 24, 1904, when major Moorhouse finally arrived in Nnewi. Nwosu Mgboli a son of Eze Onyejemeni had taken a title and been known as Eze Odumegwu and was already at the peak of his power when the British arrived at Nnewi. He hired mercenary troops from Afikpo for the prosecution of the Ubaru war and the nagging war with Awka. He won them and took the enviable title of Onuo ora, the fifth and the last to assume this rank. It was said that the hired troops were struggling back homewards when there were rumors of the major’s encampment at Oba.

Nwosu Eze Odumegwu had sent emissaries several times to the major at Oba so that on that dreadful day of the 24th of December, 1904 that major reached Nnewi, the ground was already fertile for a friendly reception. Eze Odumegwu, supported by some of his people with courage, came forward to Nkwo Nnewi to welcome the new master, bringing presents of food and such other things as previously directed. His young cousin, Eze Ugbonyamba, as well as some other Obis, was not in attendance. The Major was very impressed with the reception and accorded therefore to Eze Odumegwu the headship of the entire Nnewi town. He declined to accept the offer, saying that there was a higher Obi than himself. He promised to come along at the next meeting with the young Obi to whom the honor belonged. This he later did.   And the preservation of Nnewi traditional leadership, the hereditary head of the Nnewi kingdom hence continued.

Incumbent and family 

The present incumbent of Igwe Nnewi kingdom  is Kenneth Onyeneke Orizu III who succeeded his father as Igwe Orizu III in 1963 after the death of his father Igwe Josiah Orizu II. He was educated at Hope Waddell College, Calabar.
Before his enthronement, Kenneth worked as a Representative of the then
Eastern Nigerian Outlook Group of newspapers, in the defunct Eastern 
Region of Nigeria. He was also a very successful businessman in Kano. The next in line of succession will be his first son prince Crown Prince Obianefo Orizu

Predecessors 

Chief Mmaku
Chief Ikenga
Chief Nnewi
Chief Okpala
Chief Digbo
Chief Otolo
Chief Enem
Chief Nnofo
Chief Udude
Eze Agha (Onuo Ora)
Eze Agha Jnr
Eze Nnwa
Eze Oguine
Eze Chukwu
Eze Ukwu
Igwe Okafo
Eze ifekaibeya Igwe Iwuchukwu
Eze Ugbonyamba, Igwe Orizu I
Chief Josiah Nnaji, Igwe Orizu II
Chief Kenneth Onyeneke, Igwe Orizu III

References

Igbo monarchs
Nnewi monarchs
Nigerian traditional rulers
People from Nnewi
African royal families
Lists of monarchs
Nigerian royal families
Nigerian noble families